Chrysoupoli (before 1925: Σαπαίοι - Sapaioi or Σαρή Σαμπάν - Sari Saban) is a town and a former municipality in the Kavala regional unit, East Macedonia and Thrace, Greece. Since the 2011 local government reform it is part of the municipality Nestos, of which it is the seat and a municipal unit. The municipal unit has an area of 245.181 km2. The population of the municipal unit of Chrysoupoli in 2011 was 16,004.

It was known as "Sarışaban" during Ottoman rule. It was a kaza centre in the Sanjak of Drama, part of the Salonica Vilayet, before the Balkan Wars.

The Nestos Nature Museum is situated in Chrysoupoli.

International relations

Chrysoupoli is twinned with:
 Jagodina, Serbia
 Zlatograd, Bulgaria

References 

Populated places in Kavala (regional unit)